Emanuel Levy is an American film critic and professor who has taught at Columbia University, New School for Social Research, Wellesley College, Arizona State University and UCLA Film School. Levy currently teaches in the department of cinema studies at New York University.

Emanuel Levy was born and grew up in Tel Aviv, Israel. After military service, he attended Tel Aviv University, where he obtained a B.A. degree in Sociology, Anthropology and Political Science. He pursued a M.Phil and Ph.D. (in distinction) in Sociology of the arts (focusing on film and theater) from Columbia University in 1975 and 1978, respectively.

Career
Levy has taught at Columbia University, New School for Social Research, Wellesley College, Arizona State University and UCLA Film School. Levy currently teaches in the department of cinema studies at New York University.

He is the only critic in the U.S. who's a voting member of eight groups: Hollywood Foreign Press Association (HFPA, Golden Globes), Los Angeles Film Critics (LAFCA), Broadcast Film Critics (BFCA), National Society of Film Critics (NSFC), New York Film Critics Online (NYFCO), Gay and Lesbian Critics Association, Online Film Critics Society and the International Federation of Film Critics FIPRESCI

His first book, The Habima—Israel's National Theater, 1917–1977, launched his writing career. His critical chronicle of the Oscar Awards, And the Winner Is was published in 1986. He has published updated editions of the book, including Oscar Fever in 2000, and All About Oscar in 2003.

Of his nine books, his Cinema of Outsiders: The Rise of American Independent Film' (1999) is the most widely read film book in the history of NYU Press. The book examines the various social, political, economic and artistic forces that have shaped the emergence of low-budget American indies as a distinct institutional cinema, operating parallel to and against Mainstream Hollywood Cinema.

In his 1994 comprehensive biography of George Cukor, Master of Elegance: The Director and his Stars (William Morrow), he disputed the commonly held belief (or myth) that Cukor was fired from Gine With the Wind, because Clark Gable did not think he was "macho" enough to direct. Instead, Levy offers as reasons the conflict between him and producer David O. Selznick over the screenplay (which was not ready when shooting began) and pacing and tempo, which Selznick thought were not right.  At that time, movie stars did not have the power to fire directors, least if all Gable, who was weak and passive, very much a yes man at M.G.M. Inherently insecure, Gable feared that Cukor would tilt the movie at his expense to Vivien Leigh, who indeed had the key role, which was twice in size as that of Gable's.

Levy wrote the first comprehensive biography of Vincente Minnelli, Vincente Minnelli: Hollywood's Dark Dreamer in 2009. In this book, he argued that Minnelli's sexual identity is a crucial variable in understanding the kinds of narratives and visual styles of his films, particularly his melodramas, such as The Bad and the Beautiful, and the more personal and intimate Tea and Sympathy.

In 2000, he co-organized with the Film Department of the Los Angeles County Museum of Art a tribute weekend to the influential critic Andrew Sarris, coinciding with the publication of Citizen Sarris: American Film Critic, Essays in Honor of Andrew Sarris. On that occasion, Sarris chose to screen The Shop Around the Corner and Shoot the Piano Player, films that were followed by panels headed by noted critics Richard Schickel and Oscar-winning director Curtis Hanson.
Levy has appeared in numerous films, documentaries, TV channels, including shows on the BRAVO network and the Independent Film Channel, as well as radio programs on NPR, in which he discussed issues of Hollywood, Sundance Film Festival, Elia Kazan, Film and Politics, the Oscars, etc.

Levy has written for various newspapers and magazines, including American Film, The Advocate, Out, The Jerusalem Post, The New York Times Magazine and Los Angeles Times. Over the past 15 years, he has been a regular contributor to the film section of Financial Times. While in Arizona, he ran the ASU Film Society, and then the Scottsdale Independent Film Festival. He was a senior critic at Variety for over a decade, and the chief film critic of the UK publication Screen International for 3 years. Levy established a website of film reviews and essays in 2003, www.EmanuelLevy.com Cinema 24/7, which has global appeal. , the site contained over 30,000 film reviews, profiles, interviews and Oscar commentaries, written by Levy and a staff of writers.
Levy is the only critic/scholar in the U.S. who has served on 68 juries of international film festivals, including Cannes, Venice, Berlin, Toronto, Roma, Taormina, Turino, San Francisco, AFI, and Sundance.

Bibliography
 The Habima, Israel's National Theater: A Study of Cultural Nationalism (1979) (winner of the 1980 National Jewish Book Award)
 And the Winner Is: The History and Politics of the Oscar Awards (1987)
 John Wayne: Prophet of the American Way of Life (1988)
 Small-Town America in Film: The Decline and Fall of Community (1991)
 George Cukor: Master of Elegance (1994)
 Cinema of Outsiders: The Rise of American Independent Film (1999)
 Citizen Sarris, American Film Critic: Essays in Honor of Andrew Sarris (2001)
 Oscar Fever: The History and Politics of the Academy Awards (2001)
 All About Oscar: The History and Politics of the Academy Awards (2003)
 Vincente Minnelli: Hollywood's Dark Dreamer (2009)
 Gay Directors/Gay Films: Pedro Almodóvar, Terence Davies, Todd Haynes, Gus Van Sant, John Waters (hardcover 2015, paperback 2016)

References

External links
 Emanuel Levy's Cinema 24/7
 List of reviews by Levy
 Reviews by Levy on Critics Choice

1949 births
Living people
American film critics
National Society of Film Critics Members
Online Film Critics Society
Jewish American writers
American male non-fiction writers
Columbia Graduate School of Arts and Sciences alumni
UCLA School of Theater, Film and Television faculty
Variety (magazine) people
21st-century American Jews